Dialectica ehretiae is a moth of the family Gracillariidae. It is known from South Africa and Ethiopia.

The larvae feed on Ehretia cymosa var. abyssinica and Ehretia rigida. They mine the leaves of their host plant. The mine has the form of an irregular, oblong, moderate, almost purely epidermal blotch-mine on the upperside of the leaf. It is slightly reddish-brown with a whitish margin.

References

Dialectica (moth)
Moths of Africa
Insects of Ethiopia
Moths described in 1961